Scopula idearia is a moth of the family Geometridae. It is found in Pakistan.

References

Moths described in 1886
idearia
Moths of Asia